Großer Arbersee is a lake in the Bavarian Forest, Bavaria, Germany. It lies at an elevation of 935 metres and has a surface area of 7.7 hectares.

Lakes of Bavaria
Bohemian Forest